Igedo (Igedo Company GmbH & Co. KG) is an organiser of fashion fairs and shows established in 1949 and located in Düsseldorf, North Rhine-Westphalia, Germany. The acronym abbreviates "Interessengemeinschaft Damenoberbekleidung", in English "Community of interests for women's outerwear". Since 2004 it belongs to Messe Düsseldorf.

The former fashion fairs of the Igedo known as "Verkaufs- und Modewoche Düsseldorf", "Igedo Fashion Fairs" or "Collection premiere Düsseldorf" (CPD - 30,000 trade visitors in 2009) were at times the largest in the world. Since 2007, the Bread and Butter tradeshow in Berlin surpassed its dominance.

Igedo has branches in Moscow and Almaty.

References

External links

Companies based in Düsseldorf
Trade fairs in Germany
German fashion
Economy of North Rhine-Westphalia
Event management companies of Germany